The  is a rock-fill embankment dam on the Haneji River in Nago, Okinawa Prefecture, Japan. The purpose of the dam is flood control and water supply.

History
Planning for the dam was conducted in the late 1960s by the U.S. Army Corps of Engineers and construction on the dam began in 1981. Construction on the river diversion tunnels commenced in 1993 and work on the dam's body began in 1998. The body of the dam was complete in 2000 and the entire project in 2004.

Design
The reservoir's capacity is  while  serves as active (or "useful") capacity. The dam is equipped with an uncontrolled chute spillway.

Innovations
The dam and its facilities are equipped with several innovations to improve water quality and the environment. Water in the reservoir is aerated using a dam energy-air system. Water discharged from the dam powers two small turbines which provide electricity for the operation of shallow and deep aerators. Given the height of the dam, a traditional fish ladder was not viable. An airlift system was developed which transfers fish through tubes in and out of the reservoir. The radial gate that controls the intake was split and reversed in design. This design takes advantage of tensile strength instead of compression strength which allows for a more compact and less costly design.

References

Dams in Okinawa Prefecture
Rock-filled dams
Dams completed in 2000
Dams with fish ladders